Rollin' with Leo is the second, and final, album as a leader by American jazz saxophonist Leo Parker, recorded in 1961 but not released on the Blue Note label until 1980.

Reception
The Allmusic review by Steve Leggett awarded the album 4½ stars and calling it "a wonderful portrait of this unsung but brilliant player, whose huge, sad, but almost impossibly strong tone always felt like it carried the world on its shoulders".

Track listing
All compositions by Leo Parker except as indicated

 "The Lion's Roar" - 4:54
 "Bad Girl" (Conover) - 6:17
 "Rollin' with Leo" - 6:25
 "Music Hall Beat" (Illinois Jacquet) - 4:56
 "Jumpin' Leo" - 4:30
 "Talkin' the Blues" - 6:30
 "Stuffy" (Coleman Hawkins) - 5:41
 "Mad Lad Returns" - 4:35

Recorded on October 12 (tracks 3 & 4) and October 20 (tracks 1, 2 & 5-8), 1961.

Personnel
Leo Parker - baritone saxophone
Dave Burns - trumpet
Bill Swindell - tenor saxophone
John Acea - piano
Stan Conover (tracks 3 & 4), Al Lucas (tracks 1, 2 & 5-8) - bass
Wilbert Hogan (tracks 1, 2 & 5-8), Purnell Rice (tracks 3 & 4) – drums

References

Blue Note Records albums
Leo Parker albums
1980 albums
Albums recorded at Van Gelder Studio
Albums published posthumously